Script may refer to:

Writing systems
 Script, a distinctive writing system, based on a repertoire of specific elements or symbols, or that repertoire
 Script (styles of handwriting)
 Script typeface, a typeface with characteristics of handwriting
 Script (Unicode), historical and modern scripts as organised in Unicode glyph encoding

Arts, entertainment, and media
 Script (comics), the dialogue for a comic book or comic strip
 Script (video games), the narrative and text of a video game
 Manuscript, any written document, often story-based and unpublished
 Play (theatre), the dialogue and stage directions for a theatrical production
 Rob Wagner's Script, a defunct literary magazine edited by Rob Wagner
 Screenplay, the dialogue, action and locations for film or television
 Scripted sequence, a predefined series of events in a video game triggered by player location or actions
 The Script, an Irish band
 The Script (album), their 2008 debut album

Computing and technology
 Scripting language, in which computer programming scripts are written
 SCRIPT (markup), a text formatting language developed by IBM
 script (Unix), a command that records a terminal session
 Script, a description of procedural knowledge used in script theory, also used in artificial intelligence

Medicine and psychology
 SCRIPT (medicine), a standard for electronically transmitted medical prescriptions
 SCRIPT (mnemonic), a memory aid related to heart murmurs
 Behavioral script, a sequence of expected behaviors
 Life (or childhood) script, in transactional analysis
 Medical prescription (abbreviated Rx, scrip, or script),  official health instructions

Other uses
 SCRIPT (AHRC Centre), the Scottish Centre for Research in Intellectual Property and Technologies

See also
 Scrip, any currency substitute
 Scripps (disambiguation)
 Scripted (company), an online marketplace for businesses and freelance writers